Tyabunino is a rural locality (a village) in Myaksinskoye Rural Settlement, Cherepovetsky District, Vologda Oblast, Russia. The population was 17 as of 2002.

Geography 
Tyabunino is located 50 km southeast of Cherepovets (the district's administrative centre) by road. Vasilyevskoye is the nearest rural locality.

References 

Rural localities in Cherepovetsky District